The 1966 Detroit Tigers season was the 66th consecutive season for the Detroit franchise in the American League. The Tigers, who had finished fourth in the ten-team AL in 1965 with an 89–73 record, won one less game in 1966, going 88–74, but moved up to third in the league, ten full games behind the eventual world champion Baltimore Orioles. The team attracted  1,124,293 fans to Tiger Stadium, fifth in the ten-team circuit.

Regular season 
The 1966 season saw the maturation of the core of the 1968 world champion Tiger club, and the addition of starting pitcher Earl Wilson, a future 20-game winner. But it was marred by the in-season illnesses, ultimately fatal, that struck manager Chuck Dressen and his immediate successor, interim pilot Bob Swift.

Dressen, 71, suffered a heart attack on May 16 (his second in two years) with Detroit 16–10, three games behind the Cleveland Indians. He was admitted to a Detroit hospital and third-base coach Swift, 51, took the reins as acting manager, as he had done in 1965. Under Swift, the Tigers won 32 of their next 57 games. But during the July 11–13 All-Star break, with Detroit in second place, eight games behind Baltimore, Swift was hospitalized for rapid weight loss and what was first suspected to be food poisoning. Tests revealed that he was suffering from lung cancer, and he was forced to step aside. Dressen died August 10, and Swift succumbed October 17.

Another Tiger coach, Frank Skaff, finished the season as acting manager, with the team playing only one game above the .500 mark for him, at 40–39. The Tigers eventually hired Mayo Smith as their new manager for 1967, and Smith would lead them to within one game of the 1967 pennant and the 1968 world title.

Season standings

Record vs. opponents

Notable transactions 
 April 11, 1966: Mike Marshall was purchased by the Tigers from the Philadelphia Phillies.
 June 7, 1966: Les Cain was drafted by the Tigers in the 4th round of the 1966 Major League Baseball Draft.
 June 14, 1966: Don Demeter and a player to be named later were traded by the Tigers to the Boston Red Sox for Joe Christopher and Earl Wilson. The Tigers completed the deal by sending Julio Navarro to the Red Sox at June 21.
 July 2, 1966: Tim Hosley was signed by the Tigers as an amateur free agent.

Roster

Player stats

Batting

Starters by position 
Note: Pos = Position; G = Games played; AB = At bats; H = Hits; Avg. = Batting average; HR = Home runs; RBI = Runs batted in

Other batters 
Note: G = Games played; AB = At bats; H = Hits; Avg. = Batting average; HR = Home runs; RBI = Runs batted in

Pitching

Starting pitchers 
Note: G = Games pitched; IP = Innings pitched; W = Wins; L = Losses; ERA = Earned run average; SO = Strikeouts

Other pitchers 
Note: G = Games pitched; IP = Innings pitched; W = Wins; L = Losses; ERA = Earned run average; SO = Strikeouts

Relief pitchers 
Note: G = Games pitched; W = Wins; L = Losses; SV = Saves; ERA = Earned run average; SO = Strikeouts

Farm system 

LEAGUE CHAMPIONS: Rocky Mount

Notes

References 

1966 Detroit Tigers season at Baseball Reference

Detroit Tigers seasons
Detroit Tigers season
Detroit Tigers
1966 in Detroit